The Tamil Nadu State Film Award for Best Actress is given by the state government as part of its annual Tamil Nadu State Film Awards for Tamil (Kollywood) films. The awards were first given in 1967 and discontinued after 1970. The awards were given again in 1977 and continued till 1982. The awards were not given in the years 1971 to 1976. This award was last given in the year 2015 to Aishwarya Rajesh for Kaaka Muttai.

List of winners

See also
 Tamil cinema
 Cinema of India

References

Actor
Film awards for lead actress